WINQ (1490 AM; "WINK Country") is a radio station licensed to serve Brattleboro, Vermont. The station is owned by the Monadnock Broadcasting Group subsidiary of Saga Communications and licensed to Saga Communications of New England, LLC. WINQ simulcasts the country music programming of Keene, New Hampshire, sister station WINQ-FM.

The station had previously been assigned the WKVT call letters by the Federal Communications Commission.

WKVT was part of a network of progressive talk stations throughout the northeastern United States that are owned by Saga Communications (others including WNYY in Ithaca, New York, WHMP in Northampton, Massachusetts, WHNP in East Longmeadow, Massachusetts, and WHMQ in Greenfield, Massachusetts); these, in turn, were among the last progressive talk stations still on the air in early 2017. Because of the migration of most progressive talk shows to off-air platforms, Saga announced plans to begin dropping the format in February 2017; WNYY was the first to change, followed by WHNP, with most of the other stations in the network likely to follow.

On May 30, 2018, WKVT dropped its syndicated programming, including Stephanie Miller and Thom Hartmann, and began to carry the country music programming of Keene-based WINQ; WKVT's local morning drive time program, Green Mountain Mornings, was retained following the format change. The station changed its call sign to WINQ on June 19, 2018. Green Mountain Mornings, which was hosted by Olga Peters, was cancelled in December 2018.

Translators
In addition to the main station, WINQ is relayed by an FM translator.

Until December 2018, WINQ was heard on FM translator W262CL (100.3 FM). This translator was converted to a soft adult contemporary station, fed via the HD2 channel of WKVT-FM (which is, in turn, a simulcast of the HD2 channel of WKNE), after WINQ signed on a new translator, W295CO (106.9 FM); this translator was obtained in an FCC filing window that requires W295CO to permanently be associated with WINQ.

References

External links

Monadnock Broadcasting Group

INQ (AM)
Country radio stations in the United States
Radio stations established in 1959
1959 establishments in Vermont